Wickham Park may refer to:
Wickham Park in Brisbane, Australia
Wickham Park (Manchester, Connecticut) in the United States
Wickham Park (Melbourne, Florida) in the United States